"All the Way Turnt Up" is the first single by rapper Roscoe Dash released from his debut album Ready Set Go!. The song features rapper Soulja Boy and was produced by Vybe Beatz and K.E. on the Track.

Music video
The video features Roscoe Dash and Soulja Boy performing the song alone in some sort of stadium. The song features a skateboarder trying to jump a gap but continuously falling each time,  until the end of the video, in which he jumps and clears the gap. Also, the song features the Joseph Wheeler High School basketball team, coming off a loss and needing inspiration.

Original version
The original version was named "Turnt Up", produced by Vybe Beatz / DJD and features Atlanta rap group Travis Porter and rapper YT. This version started the feud of Travis Porter and Roscoe Dash because Travis Porter made Roscoe Dash (ATL was Roscoe Dash's stage name at the time) a featured artist of the song on one of the group's mixtapes in 2009; after finding this out Dash removed the group from the song and re-recorded it with Soulja Boy.

Remixes and other versions

Multiple remixes have been made by different artists, including Machine Gun Kelly, Hodgy Beats, Nappy Boy, Fabolous, Ludacris, and Lupe Fiasco.

Charts

Weekly charts

Year-end charts

References

External links

2009 songs
2010 debut singles
Roscoe Dash songs
Soulja Boy songs
Songs written by Soulja Boy
Interscope Records singles
Songs written by Roscoe Dash
Song recordings produced by K.E. on the Track